Go Farther in Lightness is the second studio album by Australian alternative rock band Gang of Youths. It was released on 18 August 2017 by Mosy Recordings. It debuted at number one on the ARIA Albums Chart and was supported by nationwide tours. Nominated for eight categories at the ARIA Music Awards of 2017, it won four – Album of the Year, Best Group, Best Rock Album and Producer of the Year for Gang of Youths and Adrian Breakspear. At the J Awards of 2017, Go Farther in Lightness was nominated for Australian Album of the Year. The album was certified platinum in Australia in 2020.

Lyrically, the album explores philosophy, the themes of loss and existentialism, and more broadly, "the human experience in all its bleakness and triumph". At 74 minutes, Go Farther in Lightness is sonically described as "articulate, meticulous, intense rock", and features three string interludes composed by frontman David Le'aupepe.

Preceded by four singles – most notably "What Can I Do If the Fire Goes Out?" and "Let Me Down Easy", the latter became the band's first top 50 single in Australia and placed at number two on the Triple J Hottest 100 of 2017. Notably, three tracks from the album placed in the top ten, a feat only achieved twice before.

Background 
In an interview with Richard Kingsmill on Triple J, frontman David Le'aupepe described the songwriting process for the upcoming album, saying he "went through a huge year-long writer’s block". He added that he wrote the majority of the tracks during constant touring in the year prior amidst the release of their debut extended play, Let Me Be Clear.

Composition

Lyricism 
With David Le'aupepe as sole songwriter, tracks lyrically focus on personal struggles – "Do Not Let Your Spirit Wane" was "born out of some big, screwed-up, recurring dream" about "losing something you love". Track nine, "Persevere", follows Le'aupepe "having a conversation with the friend who just lost a baby". The frontman's relationship with his father was a major lyrical inspiration, writing: "I talk about his magnolia tree. I talk about the frailty in old age he’s experiencing, and missing out on the humanity he’s really starting to demonstrate at this age."

Despite its recurring themes of frailty and loss, outlets noted the life-affirming messages and "grand epiphanies" of "The Heart is a Muscle" and closer "Say Yes to Life" – "a track of hope, glory and absolute-total-victory". Al Newstead of Triple J concluded with these tracks, Le'aupepe is "no longer roaring and snatching victory from the jaws of defeat, but singing like the weight of his emotional baggage is starting to lift".

Greek mythology is referenced throughout the record, particularly in the string-laden "Achilles Come Down", which alludes to the Iliad by Homer and the tragedy of Achilles, "introducing a fictional scenario where the Greek hero is about to take his own life". Further, Le'aupepe harshly critiques Ayn Rand's 1957 novel Atlas Shrugged in the single "Atlas Drowned". Opening track "Fear and Trembling" is named after the 1843 book of the same name by Søren Kierkegaard – the frontman also found lyrical inspiration from the literature of Martin Heidegger and Milan Kundera. The three string interludes featuring on Go Farther in Lightness are named after three theories of Jacques Lacan: the Imaginary, Symbolic and Real.

Production 
Go Farther in Lightness was recorded in six weeks alongside producer Adrian Breakspear in Sydney, and mixed in New York City by Peter Katis. Le'aupepe claimed the album was "painstakingly put together", but that its production "was like rehab in a way." Reflecting on his influences, particularly Bruce Springsteen, the frontman claims opening track "Fear and Trembling" is his "ham-fisted tribute to 'Thunder Road', which is very thinly veiled". Le'aupepe composed three string interludes for the album "to give the listener a breather, but also to reinforce some melodic information". They act as a tribute to his classically-trained father, who raised David on "everyone from Vivaldi to Puccini and Mozart". Le'aupepe had scored the final compositions, which ran over 450 pages, in three days. Track five, "L'imaginaire", is an interpolation of the guitar solo from 1988 song "Sweet Child O' Mine" by Guns N' Roses, with its melody transitioning into the following track. The second interlude, "Le symbolique", marks the record's half-way point beginning with an "elegant and moving instrumental", before "suddenly the tempo accelerates, and the energy picks up" to transition into "Let Me Down Easy".

Release 
On 6 February 2017, Le'aupepe announced that the album was almost completely finished, set to release in August. Further, he revealed the band would be relocating to London amidst visa complications for band member Jung Kim.

Lead single "What Can I Do If the Fire Goes Out?" was released on 10 February 2017 with an accompanying animated music video. They would later perform the song live on Late Night With Seth Meyers in March 2018. Second single "Atlas Drowned" followed on 12 May, alongside the announcement of an Australian tour. On 26 May, "Let Me Down Easy" was released. It became the band's first top 50 single on the ARIA Charts, peaking at number 49. A week before the full album release, fourth single "The Deepest Sighs, the Frankest Shadows" was issued on 9 August, alongside a music video following Le'aupepe as a convict escaping through fields in the early morning.

Tour 

To promote Go Farther in Lightness, the band embarked on an Australian tour from August 2017, with support act Gordi. From October 2018, Gang of Youths performed again on the Say Yes to Life Tour, which broke the Enmore Theatre's record for most sold-out shows in a single tour. All 21 shows in the tour had sold out. In December 2018, the band embarked on a North American tour.

Critical reception

Jaymz Clements of Rolling Stone gave the album five stars, saying it "poetically explores the human experience in all its bleakness and triumph, confusion and clarity, heartbreak and joyousness", and called it "a remarkable odyssey of an album that'll engulf you". Rachel Scarsbrook of Renowned for Sound made similar comments, stating the album "doesn’t fall into the trap of becoming too dark and pitiful, instead there is positivity radiating out of its every fibre". Dork concluded the album is a "poetic and gripping body of work that places Gang of Youths as not just an important band, but an important voice in 2017 and beyond".

Jessica Dale of The Music called the album "something special" and stated "Listen to [it] in its entirety; it is phenomenal and deserves nothing less than that." Stack Magazine said "Each song builds expertly, and tempos sway like tides. Parts will make you throw a defiant fist in the air and in other moments, sombre reflection is only appropriate. [David] Le'aupepe's emotional vocal is each track's initial attraction, but what really shines is the intricate instrumental detail." Triple J called the album "a stirring collection of music that places Gang of Youths another rank higher in the echelons of Aussie rock bands".

Accolades

Legacy 
Three of the album's tracks featured in the Triple J Hottest 100 of 2017, all in the top ten – peaking at number two with "Let Me Down Easy", followed by "The Deepest Sighs, the Frankest Shadows" at number five and "What Can I Do if the Fire Goes Out?" at number ten. The only other artists to have achieved this feat previously are Powderfinger in 2003 and Chet Faker in 2014. Further, three more tracks featured in the Hottest 200 the following day – "The Heart is a Muscle" at 126, and "Say Yes to Life" and "Fear and Trembling" at 175 and 176 respectively.

Go Farther in Lightness has not left the ARIA Australian Albums Chart since its debut in 2017, and has featured in numerous end-of-year top album lists. The album was certified platinum in Australia in 2020, having sold over 70 thousand copies.

In 2020, two of the album's tracks featured in the Triple J Hottest 100 of the Decade – "Let Me Down Easy" at number 19 and "The Deepest Sighs, the Frankest Shadows" at number 52.

Track listing
All lyrics are written by David Le'aupepe.

 "Fear and Trembling" – 6:03
 "What Can I Do if the Fire Goes Out?" – 4:56
 "Atlas Drowned" – 4:31
 "Keep Me In the Open" – 5:57
 "L'imaginaire" – 1:30
 "Do Not Let Your Spirit Wane" – 7:33
 "Go Farther in Lightness" – 1:48
 "Achilles Come Down" – 7:02
 "Persevere" – 4:33
 "Le symbolique" – 3:51
 "Let Me Down Easy" – 5:19
 "The Heart Is a Muscle" – 5:24
 "Le réel" – 2:22
 "The Deepest Sighs, the Frankest Shadows" – 5:52
 "Our Time Is Short" – 5:17
 "Say Yes to Life" – 5:13

Notes

 Physical versions of this album only list 12 tracks and label the four interludes "L'imaginaire", "Go Farther in Lightness", "Le symbolique" and "Le réel" in roman numerals.

Personnel 
Adapted from the album's liner notes.

Gang of Youths
 David Le'aupepe – writing, lead vocals, engineering, string arrangements, horn arrangements, piano, guitar
 Joji Malani – horn arrangements, lead guitar
 Max Dunn – bass
 Jung Kim – guitar, keyboards
 Donnie Berzestowski – drums

Additional musicians

 Justin Kearin – horn arrangements, trombone
 Darryl Carthew – horn arrangements, trumpet
 Dave Andrew – piano, keyboard
 Emma Jardine – violin
 Thibaud Hobba – violin
 Ella Jamieson – cello
 Mee Na Lojewski – cello
 Leah Zweck – string contractor
 Tulele Faletolu – backing vocals
 Kris Hodge – backing vocals
 Gloria Mati – backing vocals
 Dee Uluirewa – backing vocals

Technical
 Peter Katis – mixing (1–4, 6, 9, 11–12, 14, 16)
 Adrian Breakspear – producer, mixing (5, 7–8, 10, 13, 15), engineering
 Peter Holz – engineering
 Lewis Mitchell – engineering
 Josh Pearson – assistant
 Joe Lambert – mastering

Charts

Weekly charts

Year-end charts

Certifications

Release history

See also

 List of number-one albums of 2017 (Australia)

References

2017 albums
Gang of Youths albums
Albums produced by Adrian Breakspear
Albums produced by Gang of Youths
ARIA Award-winning albums
Sony Music Australia albums